Caryocolum siculum is a moth of the family Gelechiidae. It is found on central and south-eastern Sicily.

The wingspan is 12 mm. The forewings are dark brown, scattered with cream scales. The hindwings are light greyish brown.

The larvae feed on Gypsophila arrostii, otherwise known as Arrost's baby's breath. They live and feed in the stem of the host plant, causing an internodal gall. Pupation takes place within the gall. Larvae can be found from April to late June. They have a pale yellow body and black head. They reach a length of about 10 mm.

Etymology
The species name siculum refers to the island on which the new species was discovered.

References

Moths described in 2008
siculum
Moths of Europe